Saincaize-Meauce is a commune in the Nièvre department in central France. Saincaize station has rail connections to Nevers, Lyon and Clermont-Ferrand.

See also
Communes of the Nièvre department

References

Communes of Nièvre